
Glattalpsee is a reservoir on Glattalp, above Bisisthal, in the municipality of Muotathal, Canton of Schwyz, Switzerland.

See also
List of mountain lakes of Switzerland

References

External links

Reservoirs in Switzerland
Lakes of the canton of Schwyz
RGlattalp